Borden Island is an uninhabited, low-lying island in the Queen Elizabeth Islands of northern Canada.

Some features and history

It lies north of Mackenzie King Island and is similarly split between the Northwest Territories (larger portion) and Nunavut, with the border running along the 110th meridian west.

The first known sighting of the island was by Vilhjalmur Stefansson in 1916, it was originally described as a single landmass. However, in 1947, during an aerial survey by the Royal Canadian Air Force the island was found to be two islands divided by Wilkins Strait.

Naming

The island is named for Robert Borden, Prime Minister of Canada 1911–1920.

References

Further reading 

 Geological Survey of Canada, John Adams, and Heather Penney. The 1956 June 3 Arctic Margin Earthquake Off Borden Island, Northwest Territories. Open file (Geological Survey of Canada), 2693. 1993.

External links
 Borden Island in the Atlas of Canada – Toporama; Natural Resources Canada

Islands of the Queen Elizabeth Islands
Uninhabited islands of Qikiqtaaluk Region
Uninhabited islands of the Northwest Territories
Borders of Nunavut
Borders of the Northwest Territories